Jos Hoevenaers (30 November 1932, in Antwerp – 14 June 1995, in Wilrijk) was a Belgian cyclist, reputed for his attacking style.
In 1960 he wore the pink jersey of leadership for eight days in the Giro d'Italia, but Jacques Anquetil won instead. Bad luck, and inadequate time-trialling and sprinting stopped Hoevenaers' becoming the best Belgian Tour rider of his generation.

Major results

1955
 Berliner Rundfahrt (U23)

1956
 Berliner Rundfahrt (U23)
 Liège-Marche-Liège
 Final classification Ster van Ieper

1957
 Omloop der drie Proviniciën
 Omloop van Midden-België
 Tour de Catalonia: Stage 3A

1958
 Mandel-Leie-Schelde
 Final classification Rome-Naples-Rome

1959
 La Flèche Wallonne

1960
 Driedaagse van Antwerpen Stage 1A
 Brussel-Sint-Truiden stage 2

1961
 Schaal Sels

1962
 Omloop van Midden-België

1964
 Omloop van Midden-Brabant
 Scheldeprijs Vlaanderen
 Berner Rundfahrt

Tours de France 
1958 - 10th, 1 day in yellow jersey
1959 - 8th, 3 days in yellow jersey
1961 - 11th
1962 - 18th
1963 - 23rd

Teams 
1956 - Faema-Guerra (from 15-09)
1957 - Faema-Guerra
1958 - Faema-Guerra
1959 - Faema-Guerra
1960 - Flandria-Wiel's
1961 - Ghigi
1962 - Philco
1963 - Peugeot-BP
1964 - Flandria-Romeo
1965 - Cynar
1966 - Mann-Grundig
1967 - Goldor-Gerka

Belgian male cyclists
1932 births
1995 deaths
Cyclists from Antwerp
20th-century Belgian people